The women's triple jump event at the 2017 European Athletics Indoor Championships was held on 3 March 2015 at 12:00 (qualification) and 4 March, 17:50 (final) local time.

Medalists

Records

Results

Qualification 
Qualification: Qualifying performance 14.05 (Q) or at least 8 best performers (q) advance to the Final.

Final

References 

2017 European Athletics Indoor Championships
Triple jump at the European Athletics Indoor Championships